Mary Anne "Mamie" Cadden (27 October 1891 – 20 April 1959) was an Irish midwife, backstreet abortionist, and convicted murderer. She was born 27 October 1891 in Scranton, Pennsylvania, to Irish parents Patrick and Mary Cadden. In 1895, Cadden and her family returned to Lahardane in County Mayo, Ireland, where she completed years of schooling. Once she obtained her spot on the list of licensed midwives in Dublin, she opened a series of maternity nursing homes to aid women with health issues and to perform illegal abortions. After a series of criminal convictions, Cadden lost her status as a licensed midwife. In 1944, Cadden was charged and convicted for the murder of 33-year-old Helen O'Reilly. She was sentenced to life in prison, and after a year at Mountjoy prison, she was declared insane and moved to the criminal lunatic asylum Dundrum, where she died of a heart attack on 20 April 1959. Although many people committed backstreet abortions during the period of Cadden's life, Cadden was the only person in Ireland to be sentenced to the death penalty for a maternal death occurring as a result of an abortion. As the most notorious Irish abortionist of her era, the term 'Nurse Cadden' was synonymous with evil in the Irish public's mind.

Background

Childhood 
Mamie Cadden was born Mary Anne Caden on 27 October 1891 in Scranton, Pennsylvania, to Patrick and Mary Caden, and was the eldest of seven children, five of whom survived infancy. Patrick and Mary Cadden had met in America, where Patrick worked as a miner. In 1895, upon the death of her paternal grandfather, Mamie's father inherited his father's farm and so Cadden and her family returned to Lahardane, County Mayo. Her parents settled down, purchased a small family farm, and opened a grocery store on their land. There, her parents expanded the family and Mamie became the eldest of seven siblings and her father's favorite child. Cadden spent much of her early life on this farm, and continued to live there until she was 33 years old.

Education 
While living in Mayo, Cadden and her siblings attended school from a young age. She attended Lahardane National School in Mayo until the age of fifteen, and was literate and spoke good Irish and English. After completing school, Cadden worked on her family's farm. Once many years had passed, Mamie realized she did not want to spend the rest of her life on the farm with her next youngest brother. She had always taken an interest in midwifery, and in 1925, shortly after her sister Theresa's death, Cadden sold her portion of her land to her father to finance her midwifery certification course. She moved to Dublin to train as a midwife at the National Maternity Hospital, Dublin, and completed a six-month course, qualifying as a midwife on 10 December 1926. While there, she changed the spelling of her name 'Caden' to 'Cadden' upon her move. In 1931 she purchased a property in Rathmines and ran it as her own maternity nursing home. This was a common practice among midwives at the time, the profession then being one that operated independently of nursing and medicine.

Legal context 
During the time Mamie Cadden was entering the medical field in Ireland, the medical industry was dominated by Irish men. The Catholic Church and Irish political state were heavily intertwined. The Catholic Church wanted to ensure that medicine in Ireland operated under the ethos of the Church. This Catholic ethos helped ensure in the Irish health care system made things like contraceptives relatively inaccessible. In 1929, the Censorship of Publications Act banned the sale of literature that advocated the use of birth control. While the Act did not ban the access or sale of birth control, it did, however, ban the access to information about contraceptives. Birth control was officially prohibited in Ireland in 1935 until 1979. Many believed that birth control would tarnish the work in prenatal clinics and mother and baby entities. For many years, Catholic principles and Catholic professionals remained central to developments in the Irish medical scene. As a result, many women resorted to illegal abortions and contraceptives. These illegal actions were facilitated by people like Mamie Cadden.

Midwife and abortionist

Early career 
After Cadden completed her training at the National Maternity Hospital, Dublin, she began working as a midwife. She first worked in the Alverno maternity nursing home on Portland Row in Dublin from 1927 to 1929. In 1929, she opened her own maternity nursing home in the suburb of Ranelagh which operated until 1931. Cadden's work became quite large, and her business outgrew her facilities. In 1931, she moved her business to Rathmines and became the owner of one of Dublin's most extensive nursing homes. Based at 4 Ormonde Terrance, she later changed the name to St. Maelruin. At St Maelruin, Cadden gave help for health issues, pregnancies, illegal abortions, and foster care operations for unwanted children born. Her cousin, Molly O'Grady, helped as her maid and accomplice. Cadden also accepted fees for placing children in adoption. She also operated a fostering service, which placed children with families who received payment for caring for the child. She also procured abortions – both medical (using preparations such as ergot) and surgical (by injecting a solution). The intentional killing of an unborn child was a criminal act in Ireland at that time and remained illegal until 2018.

As there was a large demand for her services, Cadden did not need to advertise her work; and such an advertisement would have been illegal. "Nurse Cadden's" activities were an open secret and many women wanted to use her services. Enjoying a thriving business, she enjoyed a flashy social life, frequenting dances, dining and drinking in Dublin's top hotels, and driving a highly conspicuous red open-top 1932 MG sports car.

In 1939, Cadden was sentenced to a year's hard labour in Mountjoy Prison for abandoning and exposing a new-born baby on the side of the road in County Meath.

Working after her first conviction 
After her first conviction for child abandonment, Cadden was removed from the roll of registered midwives and was banned from aiding women in childbirth. When she was in prison, Cadden was forced to sell St Maelruin as she faced a financial crisis from the legal stresses of her arrest. The home sold in May 1939. During this time there was a Garda investigation of her property and the remains of an aborted fetus were found. The Gardai was able to trace the mother, who admitted consulting Cadden following a failed attempt at self-abortion. Although this discovery did not lead to charges being pressed against Cadden, they permanently rose Gardai's awareness of Cadden.

Once out of prison, Cadden resumed her illegal activities in rented premises despite having been struck off as a midwife. She also provided miscellaneous medical treatments such as supposed cures for constipation and dandruff. She fell foul of the law again in 1945 when a pregnant girl who went to Cadden for an abortion denounced her. The girl claimed that Cadden had inserted the laminaria tents which were found in her cervix. Cadden was tried under the Offences against the Person Act 1861. Despite denying the charges, she was convicted of procuring an abortion and was sentenced to penal servitude in Mountjoy Prison for five years.

Having served her full term she resumed her former trade on her release, this time in Hume Street, near Dublin's fashionable St Stephen's Green. Operating out of a one-roomed flat, she was able to continue her illegal business and was still well known enough in Dublin not to need to advertise. One of her clients died from an air embolism in the heart in 1951. Cadden left the woman's body outside on the street. Even this did not put an end to her activities as there was not sufficient evidence to connect her. Five years later, one of her patients, Helen O'Reilly, died of an air embolism during a procedure to abort a pregnancy in the fifth month. When her body was found on the pavement in Hume Street, Cadden was arrested and tried for murder. She was sentenced to death by hanging in 1956, but this was commuted to life imprisonment after public appeals for clemency and due to the unintentional nature of Helen O'Reilly's death. (The last hanging in the Republic of Ireland took place in 1954, while the last woman to be hanged was Annie Walsh in 1925.) Cadden started serving her term in Mountjoy Prison, but was declared insane and moved to the Criminal Lunatic asylum in Dundrum, Dublin, where she died of a heart attack on 20 April 1959.

Criminal record 
 1939: Cadden was sentenced to a year in prison for child abandonment. 
 1945: Cadden was sentenced to 5 years in prison for an attempt to procure a miscarriage.
 1956: Cadden was sentenced to death by hanging for the murder of Helen O'Reilly. Helen O'Reilly died as a result of an air embolism. She was 5 months pregnant, and the death occurred during an abortion. Tools to perform the illegal operation were found in Cadden's flat on Hume Street. Police found a Higginson syringe, two specula – instruments used to dilate the birth canal – and a surgical clamp. Over 80 witnesses were called to give evidence in the trial, which lasted about a week.

Cultural depictions 
In 1994, she was the subject of two episodes of RTÉ television documentaries, one in the series entitled Thou Shalt not Kill, which examined and dramatised famous Irish murder cases under the title "The body in Hume Street", and on Monday 18 November 2007, an episode of the RTÉ television documentary series Scannal featured the case under the title "Scannal: Nurse Mamie Cadden".

References 

1891 births
1959 deaths
20th-century Irish women
Abortion in the Republic of Ireland
Abortion providers
Irish midwives
Irish people convicted of murder
Irish people who died in prison custody
People from County Mayo
People from Rathmines
People from Scranton, Pennsylvania
Prisoners sentenced to death by the Republic of Ireland
Prisoners who died in Irish detention